Moldova was represented by Rafael Bobeica in the Junior Eurovision Song Contest 2013 with the song "Cum să fim".

Before Junior Eurovision

Selecția Națională 2013 
5 entries were submitted to TRM, which all were chosen to compete in the national final. After the list was released, Tatiana Ţîgîrlaş, one of the participants, withdrew from the competition.

A non-televised national final took place on 20 October 2013 at the TRM Studio 2. Four songs competed and the winner was selected by the votes of an expert jury.

At Junior Eurovision
The voting during the final consisted of 50 percent public televoting and 50 percent from a jury deliberation. The jury consisted of five music industry professionals who were citizens of the country they represent, with their names published before the contest to ensure transparency. This jury was asked to judge each contestant based on: vocal capacity; the stage performance; the song's composition and originality; and the overall impression by the act. In addition, no member of a national jury could be related in any way to any of the competing acts in such a way that they cannot vote impartially and independently. The individual rankings of each jury member were released one month after the final.

During the allocation draw on 25 November 2013, Moldova was drawn to perform 8th, following Belarus and preceding Georgia. Moldova placed 11th, scoring 41 points.

Voting

Notes

References

Junior Eurovision Song Contest
Moldova
Junior